Zardaki may refer to:
 Zardaki-ye Olya